Harold Mayot won the boys' singles tennis title at the 2020 Australian Open, defeating Arthur Cazaux in the final, 6–4, 6–1.

Lorenzo Musetti was the defending champion, but chose to participate in the men's singles qualifying as a wild card, lost to Tallon Griekspoor in the third round.

Seeds

Draw

Finals

Top half

Section 1

Section 2

Bottom half

Section 3

Section 4

Qualifying

Seeds

Qualifiers

Draw

First qualifier

Second qualifier

Third qualifier

Fourth qualifier

Fifth qualifier

Sixth qualifier

Seventh qualifier

Eighth qualifier

References 

Boys' Singles
Australian Open, 2020 Boys' Singles